The 2000–01 Indiana Hoosiers men's basketball team represented Indiana University. At beginning of the season, the head coach was Bobby Knight; however, Knight was fired early September 2000, and Mike Davis was named interim head coach.  The team played its home games in the Assembly Hall in Bloomington, Indiana, and was a member of the Big Ten Conference.

The Hoosiers finished the regular season with an overall record of 21–13 and a conference record of 10–6, finishing 3rd in the Big Ten Conference. After losing in the championship game of the Big Ten tournament to Iowa, the Hoosiers earned a 4-seed in the 2001 NCAA tournament. However, IU made a quick exit with a first round loss to 13-seed Kent State.

Roster

Schedule/Results

|-
!colspan=12 style=| Regular Season

|-
!colspan=12 style=| Big Ten tournament

|-
!colspan=12 style=|NCAA tournament

References

Indiana Hoosiers men's basketball seasons
Indiana
Indiana
2000 in sports in Indiana
2001 in sports in Indiana